Shanghai University of Finance and Economics, formerly named Zhengli Road, is a metro station as part of Line 18 of the Shanghai Metro. Located at the intersection of Zhengli Road and Wuchuan Road in Yangpu District, Shanghai, the station opened with the rest of phase one of Line 18 on December 30, 2021. It is located near the main campus of the Shanghai University of Finance and Economics. During the planning stage of Line 18, the station was also known as Wuchuan Road.

It will also be a station on the proposed Shanghai Metro Line 20, as outlined in the five-year Shanghai urban rail transit plan by the National Development and Reform Commission in 2018.

References 

Railway stations in Shanghai
Shanghai Metro stations in Yangpu District
Line 18, Shanghai Metro
Railway stations in China opened in 2021